Warren Campbell (born 19 October 1974) is a former Australian rules footballer for North Melbourne in the Australian Football League (AFL), South Fremantle in the West Australian Football League (WAFL) and St Mary's in the Northern Territory Football League (NTFL) .

Football career

Originally from Darwin, Northern Territory, he played for the St Mary's Football Club in the Northern Territory Football League (NTFL) before moving to Perth to play for South Fremantle Football Club in the West Australian Football League (WAFL) in 1992 and 1993. He was recruited to North Melbourne with the 23rd selection in the 1992 AFL Draft.

Campbell remained in WA for the 1993 season and made his debut for North Melbourne against Melbourne in Round 7 of the 1994 AFL season.  He kicked 13 goals in his first 7 games, but was then goalless for the remaining 4 games that he played in 1994.  In 1995 he only played eight games for 4 goals and was delisted at the end of the 1996 season without playing an AFL game in North Melbourne's premiership winning season.

He returned to South Fremantle for the 1997 season where he played in South Fremantle's premiership winning team, where he kicked a goal after receiving a 50-metre penalty in the final minutes of the game.  The goal gave South the lead, which they were able to maintain until the end of the match. Campell then coached the West Alice Springs football club to a premiership in 2005

Campbell then returned to Darwin and coached St Marys in the NTFL in 2006/2007.

He is the son of Basil Campbell who also played for St Marys and South Fremantle in the 1970s and 1980s.  Three players from South Fremantle's 1997 premiership team were related to members of South's previous premiership in 1980; Clem Michael is the son of Stephen Michael and Dean Rioli is the nephew of Maurice Rioli.

References

External links

Living people
1974 births
Australian rules footballers from the Northern Territory
North Melbourne Football Club players
South Fremantle Football Club players
Sportspeople from Darwin, Northern Territory
St Mary's Football Club (NTFL) players
Indigenous Australian players of Australian rules football